"Wrong Road Again" is a song written by Allen Reynolds, and recorded by American country music artist Crystal Gayle.  It was released in September 1974 as the first single from the album Crystal Gayle.

In the mid-1970s, country music was making its move into pop music by artists such as Lynn Anderson and Eddie Rabbitt. The song "Wrong Road Again" is a set example of this. Even though the song never crossed over into the pop charts, the instruments used in the sessions were not instruments normally used in country music. Crystal Gayle at the time was working to set a name for herself in the music business. "Wrong Road Again" became the song to help jumpstart her career as a country singer. The song became Gayle's first Top Ten single and showed what was to come from her in the next couple of years.

Cover versions
English singer Marianne Faithfull recorded a cover of the song on her country-flavoured album Dreamin' My Dreams in 1976 on Mike Leander's NEMS label.  (The album was later retitled "Faithless" and re-released in 1977, with a few track substitutions.)  Besides "Wrong Road Again," the album featured the Allen Reynolds-penned title track, which had also previously been recorded by Gayle and by Waylon Jennings.

Chart performance

References

External links
 

1974 singles
Crystal Gayle songs
Songs written by Allen Reynolds
Song recordings produced by Allen Reynolds
United Artists Records singles
1974 songs